Het verhaal van Nederland is a Dutch ten-part historical docudrama series broadcast by NTR that aired on NPO 1 from February 2, 2022 to April 13, 2022. Actor Daan Schuurmans has the role of narrator and presenter. The series is based on the Danish docudrama  (2017) produced by Danmarks Radio and starring actor Lars Mikkelsen as the narrator.

Historian Florence Tonk is the author of the book that served as the basis for the series.

Plot
Ten periods from Dutch history are highlighted in the series and various events are brought to life by being acted out by actors. In his role as narrator, Schuurmans is on site and only he breaks through the fourth wall, providing the viewer with an explanation. As a presenter, he walks in historically important places in the here and now to provide additional explanations. The dramatized scenes are interspersed with commentaries provided by historians and other experts. Many of the actors belong to re-enactment companies, whose specialty is to depict historical events or to provide as faithful a representation as possible of people of a particular era.

Cast

Episodes

References

External links
 Website of Het verhaal van Nederland
 

Dutch-language television shows
2015 Dutch television series debuts
2016 Dutch television series endings
2010s Dutch television series
Documentaries about historical events
Historical television series
Dutch documentary television series
Dutch television docudramas
NPO 1 original programming